GWR FM was a network of three radio stations in the south west of England broadcasting to Bristol, Bath, Wiltshire and surrounding areas. All three stations were rebranded and joined the Heart Network on 23 March 2009. 

The stations in the network were:
GWR FM Bristol which was launched in 1981 as Radio West. It relaunched as GWR in 1985
GWR FM Bath - first broadcast as GWR Radio Bath in 1987, becoming the third station in the network and sharing some programming with the Bristol station
GWR FM Wiltshire which launched in 1982 as Wiltshire Radio. In 1985, Wiltshire Radio relaunched as GWR, to coincide with the re-launch of the Bristol station

GWR Name
The initials GWR have an association with the Great Western Railway especially in the South West of England, and there is a popular misconception with listeners that the station stands for Great Western Radio. Indeed, neighbouring GWR Wiltshire was called Wiltshire Radio (WR) before its merger with Radio West. However, according to group management, the letters GWR did not stand for anything. In fact the station management at the time did try to secure the name Great Western Radio, however it was already the trading name of a Bristol electronics shop, who refused to relinquish the title.

History 

The GWR Radio brand started life in 1985 when Swindon-based Wiltshire Radio joined with Bristol's Radio West.

The Mix Network

In 1992 a re-launch of the station saw The New GWR-FM become the hub of what was The Mix Network, a network of radio stations owned by the GWR Group (later GCap Media ) covering southern England and Wales. The radio station created a tightly formatted sound where popular Top 40 chart hits were blended with older hits. This led to its "Better Music Mix" format which was then utilised on other radio stations within the GWR Group, including Essex FM, Trent FM and Beacon Radio, creating a mini national network.

Each station within the Mix Network played a centrally produced playlist. Songs were broadcast almost at the same time as neighbouring group stations and each station adopted the "Better Music Mix" tagline which was announced by local presenters in between the music. Following the introduction of the Mix Network some programming,  such as Late Night Love and The Request Fest, was syndicated across the whole network from the GWR Bristol studios.

Notable Presenters
Roo Green
Louisa Lewis
Howard Taylor
Jez Clarke
Andy Styles
Andy Henly
Steve Fountain
Scott Mills
Tim Smith
Mark Franklin
Julia Simpson
Peter Rowell
Ralph Bernard
Simon Cooper
 Alan Burston
Sue Carter
Matt Rogers
Henrietta Creasey
Shaun Skinner
Steve Colman
Neil Carter
Paul Webber
Ian Timms
Dave Barrett
Steve Orchard
Sandy Martin
Shaun Hodgetts
Vic Morgan
Stuart Mac
Charlie Wolf
Andy Westgate
Gary Vincent
Lucy Matthews
Graham Torrington
Susannah Batemen
Clive Fisher
Tony Wright
Matt Lisack
Rob Smith
Mel Everett
Trevor Fry
Mark Seaman
Johnnie Walker
Paris Troy
Andy Bush
Paulina Guilispe
Phil Phear

References

Heart (radio network)
Radio stations in England